Strumeshnitsa may refer to:

 Strumeshnitsa (river), a river in Bulgaria and North Macedonia
 Strumeshnitsa, Bulgaria, a village in Bulgaria